Dichomeris paenitens is a moth in the family Gelechiidae. It was described by Edward Meyrick in 1923. It is found in Amazonas, Brazil.

The forewings are rather dark grey. The stigmata is small, obscure, dark fuscous, with the plical slightly beyond the first discal. The hindwings (including neural pectens) are grey.

References

Moths described in 1923
paenitens